The Apple Macintosh Color Display is a 14" (11.5" viewable) Trinitron aperture grille CRT that was manufactured by Apple Inc. from October 19, 1992, until at least September 1993.  The semi-permanently attached video cable (replaceable internally) uses a standard Macintosh DA-15 video connector. The monitor has a fixed resolution of 640x480.

See also 
 Apple displays
 Sony Trinitron

References 

 EveryMac.com

Apple Inc. displays